Hussam Nima (born 1 July 1955) is a former Iraqi footballer. He competed in the men's tournament at the 1984 Summer Olympics. Hussam played for Iraq between 1984 and 1986.

References

External links
 

1955 births
Living people
Iraqi footballers
Iraq international footballers
Olympic footballers of Iraq
Footballers at the 1984 Summer Olympics
Place of birth missing (living people)
Association football forwards